Fatima bint al-Khattab was a Companion of the Islamic prophet Muhammad. She was the sister of Umar and Zayd ibn al-Khattab. She was the youngest daughter of Khattab ibn Nufayl, who married her off with his nephew, Sa'id ibn Zayd. Fatima along with her husband both converted to Islam together at the same time.

See also
Fatima (name)

References

Arab Muslims
Muslim female saints
Converts to Islam
7th-century Arabs
Banu Adi